The Rat (German: Die Ratte) is a 1918 German silent crime film directed by Harry Piel and Joe May and starring Heinrich Schroth, Olga Engl and Käthe Haack. It was part of the series of Joe Deebs detective films.

It was shot at the Tempelhof Studios in Berlin.

Cast
 Heinrich Schroth as Joe Deebs, Detektiv 
 Olga Engl as Fürstin Klankenstein 
 Stefan Vacano as Baron Bassano 
 Lina Paulsen as Gräfin Dürfeld 
 Mechthildis Thein as Baronin Orlowska 
 Leo Burg as Grauhofer 
 Hermann Picha as Vinzenz Krüger, Domtürmer 
 Werner Albes as Dr. Hans Krüger 
 Käthe Haack as Die Ratte

References

Bibliography
 Bock, Hans-Michael & Bergfelder, Tim. The Concise CineGraph. Encyclopedia of German Cinema. Berghahn Books, 2009.

External links

1918 films
Films of the German Empire
German silent feature films
Films directed by Joe May
Films directed by Harry Piel
German crime films
1918 crime films
UFA GmbH films
Films shot at Tempelhof Studios
German black-and-white films
1910s German films
1910s German-language films